NGC 3981 is an unbarred spiral galaxy located 62 million light-years away in the constellation of Crater. It was discovered on February 7, 1785 by William Herschel.

NGC 3981 is a member of the NGC 4038 Group which is part of the Virgo Supercluster.

See also
 Galaxy

References

External links

NGC 3981 on SIMBAD

3981
NGC 4038 Group
Crater (constellation)
Unbarred spiral galaxies
037496
UGCA objects
289
Astronomical objects discovered in 1785
Discoveries by William Herschel